Sagamihara Chindenti  is an earthfill dam located in Kanagawa Prefecture in Japan. The dam is used for water supply. The dam impounds about 12  ha of land when full and can store 883 thousand cubic meters of water. The construction of the dam was completed in 1954.

See also
List of dams in Japan

References

Dams in Kanagawa Prefecture